Zaire (now called the Democratic Republic of the Congo) competed at the 1984 Summer Olympics in Los Angeles, United States.
It had been 16 years since the previous time that the nation was represented at the Olympic Games as Congo-Kinshasa.

Results by event

Athletics 
Men's 5,000 metres 
 Masini Situ-Kumbanga
 Heat — 15:02.52 (→ did not advance)

Men's Marathon
 Masini Situ-Kumbanga — did not finish (→ no ranking)

Boxing 
Men's Flyweight (– 51 kg)
 Lutuma Diabateza 
 First Round — Lost to José Rodríguez (PUR), 0:5

Men's Bantamweight (– 54 kg)
 Tshoza Mukuta
 First Round — Bye
 Second Round — Lost to Pedro Ruben Decima (ARG), 0:5

Men's Lightweight (– 60 kg)
André Kimbu
 First Round — Bye
 Second Round — Lost to Gordon Carew (GUY), 0:5

Men's Light Welterweight (– 63.5 kg)
Muenge Kafuanka
First Round — Lost to Jorge Maysonet (PUR), RSC-1

Men's Welterweight (– 67 kg)
Kitenge Kitangawa
First Round — Bye
Second Round — Defeated Lefa Tsapi (LES), RSC-1
Third Round — Lost to Dwight Frazier (JAM), 2:3

Men's Light Middleweight (– 71 kg)
Fubulune Inyama
 First Round — Bye
 Second Round — Lost to Elone Lutui (TNG), 1:4

References 
 Official Olympic Reports

External links
 

Nations at the 1984 Summer Olympics
1984
1984 in Zaire